Andrea "Andy" Cunningham is an American strategic marketing and communications entrepreneur. She helped launch the Apple Macintosh in 1984 as a part of Regis McKenna, and founded Cunningham Communication, Inc. She is currently the President of Cunningham Collective, a brand strategy, marketing, and communications firm. Her book, Get to Aha! Discover Your Positioning DNA and Dominate Your Competition was published in October 2017.

Career

Early career
After graduating from Northwestern University in 1979, Cunningham started her career as a feature writer for Irving-Cloud Publishing Co. covering the trucking industry, but decided that she didn't belong in that industry. She joined Burson-Marsteller in Chicago soon after, where she helped to launch Asteroids for Atari, as well as Equal and Nutrasweet for G.D. Searle.

Regis McKenna and the Apple Macintosh
In 1983, Cunningham moved to Silicon Valley, where she joined Regis McKenna and was immediately given project lead responsibilities to work with Steve Jobs for the launch of the Apple Macintosh. She collaborated with Jane Anderson to write the Macintosh launch plan. After the launch, she continued to work with Apple as a client, helping them launch the desktop publishing category with Aldus Corporation and Adobe Systems. She contributed her experiences with Jobs to the Walter Isaacson-penned biography and the Aaron Sorkin-written Steve Jobs movie, where Sarah Snook portrays her.

Cunningham Communication
After leaving Regis McKenna in 1985, Cunningham founded Cunningham Communication, Inc., where she retained Jobs as a client for NeXT and Pixar. Her firm's work included launching RISC microprocessors for consumer personal computers with IBM and Motorola, very light jets with Eclipse Aviation, digital imaging with Kodak, and software-as-a-service with Hewlett-Packard. The firm was acquired in 2000 and renamed Citigate Cunningham.

CXO Communication
In 2003, Cunningham spun CXO Communication, a brand strategy consultancy, out of Citigate Cunningham and became CEO. Instead of focusing on traditional public relations and corporate communications, CXO focused on brand strategy and positioning. Clients included AMD, Beautiful!, Cisco, Eclipse Aviation, FutureMark, Liveops, MarketTools, PivotPoint Capital, PRTM, RSA, UCSF, VantagePoint Venture Partners, and XOJet. She left the firm in 2010 to become CMO of Rearden Commerce, where she repositioned the company's solutions under the Deem brand.

Bite Communications 
After leaving Rearden Commerce in the Fall of 2011, Cunningham advised the Bite Communications executive team on a turnaround in North America. Soon after, she was asked to become President of Bite Communications North America. She was promoted on January 1, 2013 to become the CEO of Bite's worldwide operations. She resigned in June 2013 to focus on SeriesC.

Cunningham Collective (formerly SeriesC)
While Cunningham was advising the Bite Communications team, she began to assemble the group that eventually became SeriesC. SeriesC officially launched in the Spring of 2012 with Cunningham retaining leadership positions in both SeriesC and Bite. The firm changed its name to Cunningham Collective in August 2015.

From April 2014 to August 2015, Cunningham was the interim Chief Marketing Officer of Avaya. Her tenure there was a Cunningham Collective engagement, as she continued to lead the firm during that period. She led the team that spearheaded the shift in positioning from collaboration to engagement, with an initial focus on Silicon Valley as a catalyst to revitalize awareness of Avaya to the broader tech audience. She also held an interim CMO role with Tendril and was an interim Chief Communications Officer with BlackBerry, all as Cunningham Collective engagements.

Cunningham is the author of the book Get to Aha!: Discover Your Positioning DNA and Dominate Your Competition.

Boards and non-profit activities
Andy serves on the following corporate boards: MixR(workplace community building software), Motiv Power Systems(electric vehicles), Onclusive, Specialized Bicycle Components(bicycles and related gear), and Woodward Communications, Inc. (media and marketing services). She also serves as a trustee of The Aspen Institute (since 2000) and Menlo College (since 2014).

Andy serves on the following not-for-profit advisory boards: UNICEF, Northwestern University Medill School of Journalism, Media, Integrated Marketing Communications and ZERO1: The Art & Technology Network, an organization she founded in 2000 with the mission to shape the future at the intersection of art and technology. She also serves on the Freeman Design Council, a “special forces” unit of The Freeman Company.

In addition, Andy serves as an advisor to Traackr, an influencer marketing software company.

Past board positions include RhythmOne (adtech) and Finelite, Inc. (lighting design). She also served on the not-for-profit boards of YPO, CEO, Peninsula Open Space Trust (POST) and the Computer History Museum.

Andy is an Aspen Institute Henry Crown Fellow, holds memberships in WPO, CEO, TED and Women Corporate Directors. She has taught marketing classes at Carnegie Mellon University, Harvard University, New York University, Menlo College, Northwestern University, San Jose State University, Santa Clara University, Stanford University and the University of Southern California.

References

Interviews and other mentions
 San Jose Mercury News, May 16, 1993. The Graying of Silicon Valley PC Mavericks Evolve Into 'Old Nerd' Network (Archived Article ID:9302060054)
 San Jose Mercury News, April 24, 1998. Where are S.J.'s Female-Owned Businesses? (Archived Article ID:9804250153)
 Bloomberg Television. October 2011. Apple Earnings, Business Outlook, iPhone. Retrieved May 28, 2013.
 FleishmanHillard TRUE. December 2014. Finding Avaya's Silicon Valley Cool. Retrieved February 23, 2015.
 The Economist. February 23, 2015. The Entrepreneurial CMOment: Something bigger. Retrieved February 23, 2015.
 Press: Here on NBC. May 1, 2015. Andy Cunningham. Retrieved May 2, 2015.
 Marketing Magazine. June 24, 2015. Steve Jobs' marketing maven on smashing the silicon ceiling. Retrieved June 24, 2015.

External links
 Cunningham Collective Website
 CXO Communication Website
 ZERO1 Website
 

Webarchive template wayback links
1956 births
Living people
American computer businesspeople
Silicon Valley people
American marketing people
American public relations people
Northwestern University alumni
Businesspeople from Chicago
People from Palo Alto, California
Marketing women
Henry Crown Fellows